Adrien Jean Joseph Marie Lagard (? in Lyon – 4 March 1878) was a 19th-century French composer.

He wrote more than 200 songs and ditties on lyrics by, among others, Émile Carré, Léon Quentin, Arthur Lamy or Marc Constantin, compositions for orchestra including many quadrilles, as well as many learning methods.

Works (selection) 
Songs
1865: Laïde et Jean Louis, humorous duet, lyrics by Émile Carré
1867: Le Chiffonnier philosophe, song, lyrics by Émile Carré
1871: Le 6e Étage, song, lyrics by Francisque Rivoire
1875: Les abus, humorous ditty, lyrics by Émile Durafour

Compositions for orchestra
1866: L'Anodine, polka
1867: Bagatelle avec solo de piston
1868: L'Âge d'or, quadrille
1870: Brunette, schottisch
1877: Astrée, polka-mazurka
1878: L'Ami Pascal, quadrille

Operas
1860: L'Habit de Mylord, opera, with Paul Lagarde
1868: Deux poules pour un coq, opérette bouffe for 8 women
1875: Le Jour et la nuit, saynète comique, lyrics by Alfred Deschamps

Methods
1867: Méthode de cornet à pistons illustrée de vignettes
1869: Méthode de clairon d'ordonnance
1875: Méthode de cornet à pistons illustrée de vignettes, en 2 parties, 3 vol.

Arrangements
1872: 100 Mélodies célèbres, transcrites pour cornet à pistons, ou saxhorn
1872: 40 Polkas célèbres transcrites pour le Cornet à pistons ou Saxhorn
1874: 25 Valses célèbres arrangées pour cornet à pistons ou Saxhorn
1885: 150 Airs populaires arrangés pour Cornet à pistons ou Saxborn, posth.
1885: 40 Chants nationaux du monde entier arrangés pour Cornet à pistons ou Saxkorn, posth.

References

External links 

French male classical composers
French operetta composers
French opera composers
Male opera composers
Date of birth unknown
1878 deaths